The 1974 Minnesota House of Representatives election was held in the U.S. state of Minnesota on November 5, 1974, to elect members to the House of Representatives of the 69th Minnesota Legislature. A primary election was held on September 10, 1974. This was the first partisan election of the House since 1912.

The Minnesota Democratic–Farmer–Labor Party (DFL) won a majority of seats, followed by the Minnesota Republican Party. The new Legislature convened on January 7, 1975.

Results

See also
 Minnesota gubernatorial election, 1974

References

1974 Minnesota elections
Minnesota
Minnesota House of Representatives elections